Torre del Greco ("Greek man's Tower") is a comune in the Metropolitan City of Naples in Italy, with a population of c. 85,000 . The locals are sometimes called Corallini because of the once plentiful coral in the nearby sea, and because the city has been a major producer of coral jewellery and cameo brooches since the seventeenth century.

History

Ancient period

Tracing the history of Torre del Greco is difficult given the almost complete lack of historical documentary sources. Based on archaeological evidence, in Roman times Torre del Greco was probably a suburb of Herculaneum and, like elsewhere on the Bay of Naples such as at Oplontis and Stabiae, many patrician's villas would have lined the coast. In 79 AD the eruption of Vesuvius buried the area under volcanic ash.

The nearby Roman Villa Sora was a large and sumptuous residence overlooking the sea from its 150m-long frontage, dating from the 1st c. BC, whose excavated remains can be seen today. It was built on multiple levels like the Villa of the Papyri and on the beach below are the remains of a Roman bath complex (Terme Ginnasi) and quays would have been on the shore. It was embellished in the early imperial period and was being renovated in 79 AD probably after the 62 AD earthquake as shown by the piles of lime in some rooms, unfinished precious opus sectile floors made of imported marble and a famous graffito which recorded the cost of the work.

Many exquisite statues and frescos were found here firstly in the Bourbon excavations of the 1700s which are now in the museums such as Naples and the Palermo. Its size and quality implies it belonged to an important figure, possibly of the Imperial family judging by the spectacular frescoes which during the excavations of 1989 the area inspector considered closer to the Neronian Domus Aurea than to Pompeian houses.

It was rediscovered in 1974 by the GAV Archaeological Group. Further excavations in 1989–92 exposed the areas east and west of the apsidal hall, including service corridors, reception rooms, finely decorated bedrooms and the remains visible today. It was found that the top floor collapsed following the eruption while the bottom floor was buried by the ash. The middle floor can be visited today.

Post-Roman period
Later two villages are known to have been established in the area, Sora and Calastro. The Byzantine general Belisarius moved their inhabitants to Naples in 535. Around 700, it was also known as Turris Octava, the Latin for The Tower of Eight [sides] or The Eighth Tower, probably referring to a coastal watch tower. The current name appears for the first time in 1015; according to tradition, it stems from a Greek hermit who took up residence in the tower, or from the cultivation of a particular vine from Greece.

Middle ages

Torre del Greco was part of the royal estates of the Kingdom of Naples, until King Alfonso V of Aragon ceded it to the Carafa family.

In 1631 Torre del Greco was again damaged by an eruption of Vesuvius. Its citizens bought back their rights in 1699, after paying 106,000 ducats to their landlord, the Marquis of Monforte, and thenceforth the city flourished as a maritime trading and fishing port. The tradition of coral crafting dates from this time.

The historical centre of Torre del Greco was buried under a  layer of lava in 1794.

19th and early 20th century 
At the time of the French rule of Joachim Murat, Torre del Greco, with 18,000 inhabitants, was the third largest mainland city in the Kingdom of Naples after Naples and Foggia.

Starting in the 16th century, wealthy families and even Italian nobility built elaborate summer palaces on the outskirts of the town. Among the most notable of these is the Palazzo Materazzo, renovated in the 1970s as a dance school, but later taken over by squatters after the 1980 Irpinia earthquake destroyed the homes of many of the poorer residents. In the 19th century, and continuing into the early 20th century, Torre del Greco was a popular summer resort for wealthy Italians.

In its heyday Torre del Greco was renowned for its cafés and eateries, particularly the "Gran Caffè Palumbo", a large Art Nouveau café with an extensive outdoor pavilion known for its gelato, pastries, food and coffee. The comedian Totò was among those who made Torre del Greco their annual summer retreat. The reason for Torre del Greco's popularity as a resort town was its fine beaches and the rural setting of lush farmlands and vineyards, as well as its close proximity to Vesuvius. As the town nearest to the volcano, Torre del Greco was the main starting point for tourists wishing to scale the mountain. This was facilitated by the Vesuvius Funicular, which took tourists to the crater from the town.

During World War II, the city was used as an ammunition depot by the German army, and consequently suffered heavy bombing by Allied forces.

Geography

Climate
Torre del Greco experiences a Mediterranean climate (Köppen climate classification Csa).

Economy
The city is the headquarters of Banca di Credito Popolare di Torre del Greco.

Main sights
Roman archaeological remains, including the so-called Villa Sora (1st century AD), probably a property of the Flavians.
The monastery of the Zoccolanti, with a cloister housing 28 frescoed panels depicting the life of Saint Francis of Assisi.
The parish church of Santa Croce, whose baroque belltower was buried by lava in 1794.
The 17th-century church of San Michele.
Villa delle Ginestre, where the poet Giacomo Leopardi sojourned.
The Museum of Coral.

Cameos and coral jewellery
Diving for coral has taken place in the Mediterranean Sea ever since Roman times, and in the 15th century Torre del Greco became known for its coral diving and harvesting of red coral. However, it was not until the 17th century that the first cameos were produced, and not until 1815 that a unique manufacturing contract was granted to the town by the King of Naples for a period of ten years. 

At present there are several hundred companies and several thousands of people employed in the manufacture of coral and shell cameos. Coral is now mainly imported from Asia, since areas in the Mediterranean are increasingly becoming protected. The total industry is estimated to have a turnover of around US$225 million.

Noted persons from Torre del Greco

Enzo Aprea, Journalist and writer
Salvatore Accardo, violinist and conductor
Francesco Albanese, tenor
Ruggero Bonghi, philologist and politician
Rita Bottiglieri, ex pentathlete
Ruggero Cappuccio, author and director
Vincenzo Ciaravolo, sailor, recipient of the Gold Medal of Military Valor
Valentina Bianco, actress
Salvatore Commesso, cyclist
Ermanno Corsi, journalist and writer
Ettore Capriolo, Italian translator of Salman Rushdie's The Satanic Verses 
Gino D'Acampo, chef
Nicolas De Corsi, painter
Giovanni Di Cristo, Italy national team judoka
Enrico de Nicola, first President of Italy
Maria Di Donna, singer of the 99 Posse
Mauro Esposito, footballer for A.S. Roma and the Italy national football team
Aniello Formisano, Italian senator
Nicola Lagnena, footballer
Mimmo Liguoro, journalist
Ernesto Mahieux, actor
Adolfo Margiotta, comedian
Giovanni Noto, engraver
Carlo Parlati, sculptor
Valeria Parrella, writer
Tobia Polese, painter
Massimo Rastelli, footballer
Arturo Scotto, member of the Italian Parliament
Francesco Vitiello, actor
Gennaro Vitiello, director and stage actor
Nicola Antonio Zingarelli, composer
Dario Nardella, mayor of Florence

Twin towns

Torre del Greco is twinned with:
 Montesarchio (Italy)

References

External links

Review of Torre del Greco's history and the cameo industry 
Official website 
torreweb.it 
Torrese dictionary and grammar 

 
Cities and towns in Campania
Mediterranean port cities and towns in Italy
Archaeological sites in Campania
Roman sites of Campania
Roman villas in Italy